H. Ramat Gan may refer to:

 Hakoah Amidar Ramat Gan F.C.
 Hapoel Ramat Gan Giv'atayim F.C.